Zigoitia is a municipality  in the province of Álava, in the Basque Country, northern Spain. Its capital is the village of Ondategi. In 2013 the largest common grave from the Spanish Civil War in the Basque Country was excavated in the locality.

Toponymy

Zigoitia is the form of the name in standard Basque orthography. It was adopted in 1995 by the municipal council, and published by the Boletín Oficial del Estado on 13 September 1996.

Geography

Administrative subdivisions 
The municipality contains 17 villages. All of them are organized into concejos with the exception of Larrinoa.

See also
Cave of Zubialde

References

External links
 

Municipalities in Álava